The men's 10,000 metres at the 2010 European Athletics Championships was held at the Estadi Olímpic Lluís Companys on 27 July. Mo Farah won the gold medal.

Medalists

Records

Schedule

Results

Final

References

 Results
Full results

10000
10,000 metres at the European Athletics Championships
Marathons in Spain